IPARK is an apartment brand launched by Hyundai Development Company in 2001. Prior to IPARK, Hyundai Development Company used Hyundai Apartment as the main brand for its housing business. Hyundai Apartment has been ranked the most powerful brand in the apartment segment since it built Hyundai Apartment complex in Apgujeong-dong in 1976. Hyundai Development Company launched IPARK, which was an aspiration to make apartments more than a place to live but a place to create new life style. Hyundai Development Company has built more than 350,000 housing units across the country under the brand names such as Hyundai Apartment and IPARK.

The letter "I" in IPARK stands for innovation and reflects Hyundai Development Company's commitment to innovate the conventional concept of apartments. "PARK" symbolizes a space which creates enjoyable and comfortable cultural experiences. IPARK adds a more upscale and refined image to Hyundai Apartment, known for its reliable and comfortable image.

Landmarks

Samseong-dong IPARK 
With the completion of Samseong-dong IPARK in 2004, IPARK has firmly established its presence as a sophisticated, eco-friendly brand. Samseong-dong IPARK's building-to-land ratio is only 9%. In other words, its green space accounts for 88% of the project site measuring 33,057 square meters, which exposes innovation and eco-friendliness concept. The green space is four times larger than that of Jamsil Soccer Stadium. Samseong-dong IPARK is designed to withstand earthquakes with magnitude of 8 and the destructive power of very high winds and is expected to last more than 100 years. The pre-sale price of Samseong-dong IPARK set a new record, exceeding that of Samseong Tower Palace, and all pre-sale units were sold out. According to 2008 government data, Samseong-dong IPARK is the most expensive housing unit in South Korea.

Haeundae IPARK 
Haeundae IPARK is a 72-story residential-commercial building established as an upscale marine leisure complex in Haeundae, Busan. Haeundae IPARK has five wings including three residential-commercial buildings and two hotel and office tower buildings. Daniel Libeskind, a world-renowned architect, designed Haeundae IPARK inspired by Korea's nature and the beauty of curved lines found in tidal waves in Haeundae beach and camellia, Busan City's symbol flower. The curved shape is aesthetic and creates the best view for residents. Haeundae IPARK is close to Yacht Marina Center, which can accommodate around 1,360 boats and Haeundae beach, offering good access to marine leisure sports. Haeundae IPARK is also close to cultural attractions and shopping centers such as Busan Exhibition & Convention center, CENTUM City, Nurimaru APEC Hall, Cinematheque Busan and Busan Museum of Art.

Suwon IPARK CITY 
Suwon IPARK CITY is the private city development project which Hyundai Development Company singlehandedly undertook in Suwon. Suwon IPARK CITY covers 990,000 m2 with 6,585 housing units, themed shopping facilities, commercial and public facilities. The world-renowned architect, Ben van Berkel, designed Suwon IPARK CITY, drawing inspiration from natural surrounding such as woods, valleys, lands, horizon, and water waves. Suwon IPARK CITY is characterized for its creative and resident-friendly design such as "Convertible Living Space" that can be reconfigured to serve different functions and "Library House" which transforms the living room into a study.

Brand Identity (B/I)

References

HDC Hyundai Development Company